Luigi Oreglia di Santo Stefano (9 July 1828, Bene Vagienna, Italy – 7 December 1913, Rome, Italy) was a cardinal of the Catholic Church in the late nineteenth century. He was Bishop of Ostia e Velletri and Dean of the Sacred College of Cardinals from 1896 until his death.

Biography
He was educated in Turin and became a priest in 1851. After that, he soon rose to become domestic prelate of Pope Pius IX by 1857 and was internuncio in the Netherlands from 1863 to 1866. In May of that year he was elected titular archbishop of Tamiathis and served as papal nuncio to Belgium from then until 1868, when he was moved to Portugal. He remained as nuncio until his promotion to the cardinalate when he was returned to Rome.

On 22 December 1873 Oreglia was created a cardinal by Pius IX and two years later he became Prefect of the Sacred Congregation of Indulgences and Relics. He participated in the 1878 conclave that elected Pope Leo XIII and that pope appointed him Camerlengo on 27 March 1882. Although Oreglia was forced to relinquish the post a year later, he became Camerlengo once more in 1885 and retained that post right up to his death 28 years later. During this period he rose gradually to become sub-Dean of the College in 1889 and to Dean in 1896.

When Leo XIII died in 1903, Cardinal Oreglia was the sole cardinal elevated by Pope Pius IX. As the only elector in the 1903 conclave with previous experience in electing a pope, and being the leader of the ultraconservative curial faction within the college who wanted a more intransigent pontiff than Leo, Oreglia is widely believed to have played a prominent role in the election of Giuseppe Sarto as Pius X. Indeed, some students of the papacy believe that without the guidance of Oreglia, Cardinal Sarto would have refused the papacy even when he had obtained 55 of the 60 available votes.

Oreglia is also said to have vehemently protested against the announcement by Cardinal Jan Puzyna de Kosielsko regarding the civil veto of Emperor Franz Joseph of Austria against the name of Cardinal Mariano Rampolla, Leo's Secretary of State. Oreglia is also rumored to have prohibited the use of the method of election known as accessus in the 1903 Conclave that elected Pope Pius X.

Oreglia retained his positions with the College of Cardinals until his death in 1913 at the age of 85.

References

External links
 Biography (scroll down to #9)
 Biographical information

19th-century Italian cardinals
Cardinals created by Pope Pius IX
Deans of the College of Cardinals
Cardinal-bishops of Ostia
Cardinal-bishops of Palestrina
Cardinal-bishops of Porto
1828 births
1913 deaths
Camerlengos of the Holy Roman Church
20th-century Italian cardinals
People from Bene Vagienna